Mike Pallagi (born August 19, 1975 in Alexandria, Virginia) is an American screenwriter, producer, copywriter, and novelist.

He has worked for clients like Nintendo, Arizona State Fair, JCPenney, McDonald's, InSinkErator, The Arizona Republic, Dremel, Bank of America, General Electric, and others; as a producer of the Crispin Glover film What Is It? (which played at the 2005 Sundance Film Festival); and as a freelance script doctor on several independent features.  Pallagi holds a degree in English Literature from Arizona State University. In September 2011, he published his first novel, Dax Klick and the Ancient City of Bronze.

Filmography
 What Is It? (2005) – producer

Bibliography
 I'd Plan Differently (2000; short stories)
 Dax Klick and the Ancient City of Bronze (2011; novel)
 Dax Klick and the Speed of Light (2015; novel)
 Catch a Ghost with Cinnamon Toast (2015; novella)

External links
MikePallagi.com

References
Garcia, Gilbert. "Onward, Crispin Soldiers." July 15, 1999. Phoenix New Times.

1975 births
Living people
American male screenwriters
Arizona State University alumni
Writers from Alexandria, Virginia
Screenwriters from Virginia
Screenwriters from Arizona